Hagen Hauptbahnhof is a railway station serving the city of Hagen in western Germany. It is an important rail hub for the southeastern Ruhr area, offering regional and long distance connections. The station was opened in 1848 as part of the Bergisch-Märkische Railway Company's Elberfeld–Dortmund line and is one of the few stations in the Ruhr valley to retain its original station hall, which dates back to 1910.

History 

The original Elberfeld–Dortmund trunk line of the Bergisch-Märkische Railway Company was completed in 1848/49 linking Hagen to the rapidly expanding Prussian railway network. This led to Hagen quickly becoming an industrial city based steel and metal production. After the opening of the Ruhr–Sieg railway to Siegen via Altena in 1861 the city also became an important railway junction.

The Baroque Revival entrance building, opened on 14 September 1910, was built of brick and partly covered with sandstone. It survived bombing during the Second World War, although not completely, in contrast to other stations in the Ruhr area, so it can be admired today. A stained-glass window called The Artist as Teacher of Trade and Industry by Johan Thorn Prikker was installed above the entrance by Karl Ernst Osthaus in 1911.

Also preserved is a two-span train shed designed by Stephany from 1910. It was restored in the 1990s and is heritage-listed as an important example of a steel-constructed hall developed in the late 19th century. It is the only remaining station with a "traditional" platform area in Westphalia and the Ruhr region and one of a few of its kind in Germany. The heavy Anglo-American bombing raids in World War II on Hagen did not destroy it, unlike many other railway stations in the Ruhr.

The station has points and overtaking tracks connecting to the two main platforms in the train shed. This allows up to four (short) trains to operate from each of these two-edged platforms. This has the disadvantage that passengers may sometimes be required to walk long distances.

The interior of the station was painstakingly restored from the autumn of 2004 to May 2006. Thus, the barrel vault over the concourse has been reconstructed, restoring some of its old lustre and details, including Thorn Prikker's stained-glass window, are now illuminated by daylight and are again clearly visible. This work was carried out for the 2006 World Cup of football at a total cost of €1.2 million.

The Hagen Hauptbahnhof is a listed building and is part of The Industrial Heritage Trail (Route Industriekultur).

Rail services

The station serves as an important link between long distance services; the InterCityExpress lines linking Cologne and Berlin call at the station as well as various InterCity and EuroCity services.

Regional and S-Bahn trains
Hagen Hbf lies within the area of the Verkehrsverbund Rhein-Ruhr transport association and is served by several RegionalExpress and RegionalBahn lines as well as by three S-Bahn services of the Rhein-Ruhr S-Bahn network. The following Regional-Express, Regionalbahn and S-Bahn services call at the station:

References

Railway stations in North Rhine-Westphalia
Railway stations in Germany opened in 1848
Rhine-Ruhr S-Bahn stations
S5 (Rhine-Ruhr S-Bahn)
S8 (Rhine-Ruhr S-Bahn)
S9 (Rhine-Ruhr S-Bahn)
Buildings and structures in Hagen
1848 establishments in Prussia